Li Ting (born April 1, 1987 in Lingui, Guilin, Guangxi) is a female diver from the People's Republic of China.  She is a member of the Dong Chinese ethnic minority.

Li started training in 1993 the second Chengguan primary school. She joined Guangxi Divers' School in 1994, and became a member of the provincial squad a year later. She was selected for the Chinese national squad in 1999.

Partnered by her twin sister Li Rao (李嬈) in the 9th annual Chinese national championships, she obtained the bronze medal for synchronised diving from a 10m platform. She won a gold medal at the 2002 Asian Games, as well as Gold and bronze medals in the synchronised and individual high-diving events. In the 2003 FINA World Championships she was declared winner of the synchronised high-diving event.

Li competed at the 2004 Summer Olympics, earning a gold medal in the women's 10 meter synchronized platform diving along with her team partner Lao Lishi.

External links
NBC Olympics

1987 births
Living people
Divers at the 2004 Summer Olympics
Olympic divers of China
Olympic gold medalists for China
People from Guilin
Olympic medalists in diving
Twin sportspeople
Chinese twins
Chinese female divers
Sportspeople from Guangxi
Medalists at the 2004 Summer Olympics
World Aquatics Championships medalists in diving
Asian Games medalists in diving
Divers at the 2002 Asian Games
Divers at the 2006 Asian Games
Asian Games gold medalists for China
Medalists at the 2002 Asian Games
Medalists at the 2006 Asian Games
Universiade medalists in diving
Kam people
Universiade gold medalists for China
Medalists at the 2005 Summer Universiade
Medalists at the 2007 Summer Universiade
21st-century Chinese women